Parliamentary elections were held in Egypt on 27 May 1984. Since the last election in 1979, changes had been made to the electoral system. The 176 two-member constituencies were replaced by 48 multi-member constituencies (totalling 448 seats), with candidates elected on a party list system, with a party needing over 8% of the vote to win a seat.

The result was a victory for the ruling National Democratic Party, which won 390 of the 448 seats. The only other party to win seats was the New Wafd Party. Following the election, President Hosni Mubarak appointed a further 10 members to the Assembly; one from the NDP, four from the Socialist Labour Party, one from the National Progressive Unionist Party and four Copts. Voter turnout was 43.1%.

Results

References

Elections in Egypt
Parliamentary election
Egypt
Egyptian parliamentary election